Marh is a village and municipality in Jammu district of the Indian union territory of Jammu and Kashmir. The village is located 26 kilometres from district headquarters Jammu.

Demographics
According to the 2011 census of India, Wavoora has 228 households. The literacy rate of Marh village was 82.06% compared to 67.16% of Jammu and Kashmir. In Marh, Male literacy stands at 88.63% while the female literacy rate was 74.60%.

Transport

Road
Marh is connected by road with other places in Jammu and Kashmir and India by the NH 144A.

Rail
The nearest railway station to Marh is Jammu Tawi railway station located at a distance of 30 kilometres.

Air
The nearest airport is Jammu Airport located at a distance of 32 kilometres.

See also
Marh (Vidhan Sabha constituency)

References

Villages in Jammu district